In Greek mythology, there were several people named Anthedon (Ancient Greek: Ἀνθηδών means "rejoicing in flowers") — at least two male and one female.

 Anthedon, possible father of Glaucus, a sea god — whose mother might have been Alcyone.
 Anthedon, son of Dius and grandson of Anthas, thus great-grandson of Poseidon and Alcyone, eponym of the town Anthedon in Boeotia.
 Anthedon, the Naiad nymph of Anthedon, Boeotia.

Notes

References 

Athenaeus of Naucratis, The Deipnosophists or Banquet of the Learned. London. Henry G. Bohn, York Street, Covent Garden. 1854. Online version at the Perseus Digital Library.
Athenaeus of Naucratis, Deipnosophistae. Kaibel. In Aedibus B.G. Teubneri. Lipsiae. 1887. Greek text available at the Perseus Digital Library.
Graves, Robert, The Greek Myths, Harmondsworth, London, England, Penguin Books, 1960. 
Graves, Robert, The Greek Myths: The Complete and Definitive Edition. Penguin Books Limited. 2017. 
Pausanias, Description of Greece with an English Translation by W.H.S. Jones, Litt.D., and H.A. Ormerod, M.A., in 4 Volumes. Cambridge, MA, Harvard University Press; London, William Heinemann Ltd. 1918. Online version at the Perseus Digital Library
 Pausanias, Graeciae Descriptio. 3 vols. Leipzig, Teubner. 1903.  Greek text available at the Perseus Digital Library.
 Stephanus of Byzantium, Stephani Byzantii Ethnicorum quae supersunt, edited by August Meineike (1790-1870), published 1849. A few entries from this important ancient handbook of place names have been translated by Brady Kiesling. Online version at the Topos Text Project.

Nymphs
Boeotian characters in Greek mythology
Boeotian mythology